In engineering, macro-engineering (alternatively known as mega engineering) is the implementation of large-scale design projects. It can be seen as a branch of civil engineering or structural engineering applied on a large landmass. In particular, macro-engineering is the process of marshaling and managing of resources and technology on a large scale to carry out complex tasks that last over a long period.In contrast to conventional engineering projects, macro-engineering projects (called macro-projects or mega-projects) are multidisciplinary, involving collaboration from all fields of study. Because of the size of Macro-projects they´re are usually international.

Macro-engineering is an evolving field that has only recently started to receive  attention. Because we routinely deal with challenges that are multinational in scope, such as global warming and pollution, macro-engineering is emerging as a transcendent solution to worldwide problems. 

Macro-engineering is distinct from Megascale engineering due to the scales where they´re applied.Where macro-engineering is currently practical, mega-scale engineering is still within the domain of speculative fiction because it deals with projects on a planetary or stellar scale.

Projects
Macro engineering examples include the construction of the Panama Canal and the Suez Canal.

Planned Projects
We can find examples of projects that could be completed in a near future such as the Channel Tunnel and the planned Gibraltar Tunnel.

Two intellectual centers focused on macro-engineering theory and practice are the Candida Oancea Institute in Bucharest, and The Center for Macro Projects and Diplomacy at Roger Williams University in Bristol, Rhode Island.

See also

 Afforestation
 Agroforestry
 Atlantropa (Gibraltar Dam)
 Analog forestry
 Bering Strait bridge
 Buffer strip
 Biomass
 Biomass (ecology)
 Climate engineering (Geoengineering)
 Collaborative innovation network
 Deforestation
 Deforestation during the Roman period
 Ecological engineering
 Ecological engineering methods
 Ecotechnology
 Energy-efficient landscaping
 Forest gardening
 Forest farming
 Great Plains Shelterbelt
 Green Wall of China
 IBTS Greenhouse
 Home gardens
 Human ecology
 Megascale engineering
 Permaculture
 Permaforestry
 Sahara Forest Project 
 Qattara Depression Project
 Red Sea dam
 Sand fence
 Seawater Greenhouse
 Sustainable agriculture
 Terraforming
 Windbreak
 Wildcrafting

References
 Frank P. Davidson and Kathleen Lusk Brooke, BUILDING THE WORLD: AN ENCYCLOPEDIA OF THE GREAT ENGINEERING PROJECTS IN HISTORY, two volumes (Greenwood Publishing Group, Oxford UK, 2006)
 V. Badescu, R.B. Cathcart and R.D. Schuiling, MACRO-ENGINEERING: A CHALLENGE FOR THE FUTURE (Springer, The Netherlands, 2006)
 R.B. Cathcart, V. Badescu with Ramesh Radhakrishnan, (2006): Macro-Engineers' Dreams PDF, 175pp. Accessed 24 May 2013
 Alexander Bolonkin and Richard B. Cathcart, Macro-Projects (NOVA Publishing, 2009)
 Viorel Badescu and R.B. Cathcart, Macro-engineering Seawater (Springer, 2010), 880 pages.
 R.B. Cathcart, MACRO-IMAGINEERING OUR DOSMOZOICUM. (Lambert Academic Publishing, 2018) 154 pages.

External links
 Engineering and the Future of Technology
 Megaengineering at Popular Mechanics